Cisów may refer to the following places in Poland:
Cisów, Lower Silesian Voivodeship (south-west Poland)
Cisów, Podlaskie Voivodeship (north-east Poland)
Cisów, Łódź Voivodeship (central Poland)
Cisów, Świętokrzyskie Voivodeship (south-central Poland)
Cisów, Lubusz Voivodeship (west Poland)